Henry Watkins may refer to:
Henry Watkins (diplomat) (1666-1727), MP for Brackley, Northants.
Henry Watkins (priest) (1844–1922), Anglican priest, academic and author
Henry Hitt Watkins (1866–1947), United States federal judge
Gino Watkins (Henry George Watkins, 1907–1932), Arctic explorer
Henry Watkins, a character in the 1981 film Amy

See also
Harry Watkins (disambiguation)
Henry Watkin (1824–1910), English printer
Henry Watkins Allen (1820–1866), American soldier and politician